Anthony Martin Kimmins, OBE (10 November 1901 – 19 May 1964) was an English director, playwright, screenwriter, producer and actor.

Biography
Kimmins was born in Harrow, London on 10 November 1901, the son of the social activists Charles William Kimmins and Grace Kimmins. He served in the Royal Navy, and upon leaving the navy he became an actor. In 1932, he wrote the comedy play While Parents Sleep which had a long run in the West End. In 1935, another of his plays Chase the Ace was staged.

His first directorial assignment was Keep Fit (1937). with George Formby. During World War II, he returned to the Navy achieving the rank of Commander. In 1941, he took part in Operation Claymore a successful Commando raid in Norway. During the success of the raid,  Kimmins is said to have gone skiing on a nearby slope out of boredom, according to John Durnford-Slater. He would later run the British Pacific Fleet newspaper in Sydney during the Pacific war. Kimmins received the OBE in 1946.

After the war he produced an eclectic mix of films, such as the psychological thriller Mine Own Executioner (1947), Bonnie Prince Charlie (1948) and Mr. Denning Drives North (1951). In the 1950s, Kimmins work included the Alec Guinness comedy The Captain's Paradise (1953) and the children's Smiley series of films. His final film as director harked back to his early days – it was a version of his stage successThe Amorous Prawn (US: The Playgirl and the War Minister, 1962).

He was the subject of This Is Your Life in 1961 when he was surprised by Eamonn Andrews at the BBC Television Theatre. His son, Simon Kimmins, played first-class cricket in the 1950s, primarily for Kent County Cricket Club.

He died in 1964, at his home in Hurstpierpoint in West Sussex, at the age of 62.

Credits

Filmography

 Two Wives for Henry (1933) - writer
 The Golden Cage (1933) - writer (uncredited)
 The Night Club Queen (1934) - play
 Bypass to Happiness (1934) - writer, director
 The Diplomatic Lover (1934) aka How's Chances? - writer, director
 Midshipman Easy (1935) - writer
 Once in a New Moon (1935) - writer, director
 While Parents Sleep (1935) - writer, play
 All at Sea (1935) - writer, director
 His Majesty and Company (1935) - director
 Talk of the Devil (1936) - writer
 Queen of Hearts (1936) - writer
 Scotland Yard Commands (1936)
 Laburnum Grove (1936) - writer
 Three Maxims (1936) - director
Talk of the Devil (1936) - writer
 Keep Your Seats, Please (1936) - writer
Lonely Road (US: Scotland Yard Commands, 1936) - writer
 The Show Goes On (1937) - writer
Parisian Life (1936) - writer
Who's Your Lady Friend? (1937) - writer
 Feather Your Nest (1937) - writer
Good Morning, Boys (1937) - writer
Keep Fit (1937) - writer, director
 I See Ice (1938) - writer, director
George Takes the Air (1938) aka It's in the Air - writer, director
 Trouble Brewing (1939) - writer, director
 Come on George (1939) - writer, director
 Under Your Hat (1940) - writer
Narcisse (1940) - novel
 Mine Own Executioner (1947) - director, producer
 Bonnie Prince Charlie (1948) - director
 Mr. Denning Drives North (1951) - director, producer
 Flesh and Blood (1951) - director
 The Passionate Sentry (1952) - director, producer
 The Captain's Paradise (1953) - director, producer
Top of the Form (1953) - writer
 Aunt Clara (1954) - director, producer
 Smiley (1956) - director, writer, producer
"While Parents Sleep" episode of Armchair Theatre (1957) - writer
 Smiley Gets a Gun (1958) - director, writer, producer
 The Amorous Prawn (US: The Playgirl and the War Minister, 1962) - director, writer (and original play)

Select theatre credits
 While Parents Sleep (1932)

References

External links
Profile, nytimes.com; accessed July 4, 2015
 
 

1901 births
1964 deaths
Royal Navy officers
English film directors
English male screenwriters
English male dramatists and playwrights
People from Harrow, London
Male actors from London
Writers from London
20th-century English screenwriters
20th-century English male writers
Royal Navy officers of World War II
Military personnel from London